Naranjal (Spanish for orange grove) may refer to:

 Naranjal (canton), Ecuador
 Naranjal, Ecuador
 Naranjal District, Paraguay
 Naranjal, Veracruz, Mexico
 Naranjal mine, a legendary lost gold mine in the Sierra Mountains of Mexico
 Naranjal, hacienda in San Martín de Porres District
 Naranjal (Colombia)